Not of this World is the sixth studio album of the Christian rock band, Petra. It was released in 1983. It is very similar to its predecessor (More Power to Ya), and Bob Hartman has stated that he considers it to be the musical equivalent of a sequel. This album includes some of the group's most popular recordings from the 1980s.

The use of keyboards is featured prominently in this album compared to its predecessor, but not nearly to the level as featured on Beat the System.

Track listing
All songs written by Bob Hartman, except where noted.
 "Visions (Doxology)" – 2:04 (traditional, arr John Slick)
 "Not of this World" – 4:49
 "Bema Seat" – 3:54
 "Grave Robber" – 4:18
 "Blinded Eyes" – 5:33
 "Not by Sight" – 3:20 (John Slick)
 "Lift Him Up" – 3:26
 "Pied Piper" – 4:00
 "Occupy" – 3:28 (John Slick)
 "Godpleaser" – 4:35
 "Visions (reprise) (Doxology)" – 2:28 (traditional, arr John Slick)

Awards
 Nominated for the 1985 Grammy Award for Best Gospel Vocal Performance by a Duo or Group, Choir or Chorus.

Personnel 
Petra
 Greg X. Volz – lead vocals, rhythm guitar, percussion
 Bob Hartman – lead guitar, acoustic guitar, backing vocals
 John Slick – keyboards, backing vocals
 Mark Kelly – bass, backing vocals
 Louie Weaver – drums, backing vocals

Production
 Jonathan David Brown – producer, recording at Rivendell Recorders, Pasadena, Texas, mixing at Rivendell Recorders
 Dave Rogers – assistant engineer 
 Doug Sarrett – assistant engineer
 Steve Hall – mastering at Future Disc Systems, Hollywood, California
 Joan Tankersley – art direction 
 Randy Rogers – illustration
 Lori Cooper – layout 
 Mark Tucker – sleeve photography
 Vocals recorded at Gold Mine Studios, Nashville, Tennessee

References

1983 albums
Petra (band) albums